Matumona Lundala known most simply as Goliath (born August 1, 1972 in Esperança) is an Angolan goalkeeper who won the 2005 Angolan Cup with Sagrada Esperança. He is measured at 1.81 m (5 ft 11 in) and 92 kg (202 lb or ). He was also a member of the Angolan squad at the African Cup of Nations in 2006 acting as experienced back-up for first-choice shotstopper João Ricardo.

National team statistics

References

External links
 Angolan players Matumona Lundala Goliath

1972 births
Living people
Angolan footballers
2006 Africa Cup of Nations players
Association football goalkeepers
People from Cuanza Norte Province
Angola international footballers